The Frizette Stakes is an American Thoroughbred horse race for two-year-old fillies raced annually at Belmont Park in October. It is currently a Grade I stakes race at a distance of one mile.  The Frizette is the female counterpart of the Champagne Stakes.

The race is currently part of the Breeders' Cup Challenge series.  The winner automatically qualifies for the Breeders' Cup Juvenile Fillies.

The Frizette was named for the James R. Keene owned and bred racing filly who won the Rosedale Stakes in 1907 and one of the most important foundation mares of the twentieth century. Sired by Hamburg, Frizette was the granddam of the Hall of Fame inductee, Myrtlewood.

Inaugurated in 1945, the Frizette was first run at the Jamaica Race Course, then ran at Aqueduct Racetrack in 1960, 1961, and from 1963 to 1967. There was no race run from 1949 through 1951.

Since inception, it has been run at various distances:
 5 furlongs : 1948
 6 furlongs: 1945–1947, 1952–1953
 1 mile : 1960–1993, 2005 to present
  miles : 1954–1958, 1994–2004
  miles : 1985

Records
Speed  record: (at current distance of 1 mile)
 1:34.57 – Jaywalk (2018)

Most wins by a jockey:
 4 – Laffit Pincay Jr. (1974, 1980, 1985, 1988) 
 4 – Jerry D. Bailey (1992, 1997, 1998, 2000)
 4 – John R. Velazquez (2002, 2005, 2009, 2012)

Most wins by an owner:
 4 – Ogden Phipps (1967, 1971, 1986, 1993)

Most wins by a trainer:
 7 – D. Wayne Lukas (1985, 1987, 1988, 1989, 1994, 1995, 1999)

Winners of the Frizette Stakes

See also
Road to the Kentucky Oaks

References

The Frizette Stakes at Pedigree Query

Horse races in New York (state)
Belmont Park
Flat horse races for two-year-old fillies
Breeders' Cup Challenge series
Grade 1 stakes races in the United States
Graded stakes races in the United States
Recurring sporting events established in 1945
Jamaica Race Course
1945 establishments in New York (state)